John Bleecker Cooke (May 17, 1885 – June 26, 1971) served in the California State Assembly for the 40th district from 1941 to 1943, the 38th and 37th district from 1947 to 1955. During World War I and World War II he also served in the United States Navy. Cooke died in Palo Alto in 1971 and was buried in Arlington National Cemetery.

His younger brother, Charles M. Cooke Jr., was a United States Naval Academy graduate and four-star admiral.

References

External links
Arlington National Cemetery

United States Navy personnel of World War I
1885 births
1971 deaths
20th-century American politicians
Democratic Party members of the California State Assembly